An écraseur is a surgical instrument containing a chain or wire loop that is used to encircle and sever a projecting mass of tissue (as the testicles of a horse or a pedicled tumor) by gradual tightening of the chain or loop.

See also
Instruments used in general surgery

References

Sources
 http://www.merriam-webster.com/medical/%C3%A9craseur

Surgical instruments